"Believer" is a song by Australian singer Guy Sebastian, released on 20 August 2021 as the seventh single from his ninth studio album T.R.U.T.H.. Sebastian performed a pre-recorded version of "Believer" during the semi-final of The Voice (Australian season 10) which aired on 5 September 2021. The song peaked at number 69 on the ARIA the following week.

Via social media, Sebastian said "'Believer' is a really special song to me, written for my Jules. When I performed this as part of the Ridin' with You tour, I heard from so many of you that you loved this one".

Music video
The music video for "Believer" was released on 20 August 2021. It was directed by ARIA Award winning director, James Chappell.

Charts

References

2021 singles
2020 songs
Guy Sebastian songs
Songs written by David Hodges
Songs written by Guy Sebastian